Dhanyakuria is a census town in the Basirhat II CD block in the Basirhat subdivision in the North 24 Parganas district  in the state of West Bengal, India.

Geography

Location

Area overview
The area shown in the map is a part of the Ichhamati-Raimangal Plain, located in the lower Ganges Delta. It contains soil of mature black or brownish loam to recent alluvium. Numerous rivers, creeks and khals criss-cross the area. The tip of the Sundarbans National Park is visible in the lower part of the map (shown in green but not marked). The larger full screen map shows the full forest area. A large section of the area is a part of the Sundarbans settlements. The densely populated area is an overwhelmingly rural area. Only 12.96% of the population lives in the urban areas and 87.04% of the population lives in the rural areas.

Note: The map alongside presents some of the notable locations in the subdivision. All places marked in the map are linked in the larger full screen map.

Demographics
According to the 2011 Census of India Dhanyakuria had a total population of 5,148, of which 2,640 (51%) were males and 2,508 (49%) were females. Population in the age range 0–6 years was 415. The total number of literate persons in Dhanyakuria was 4,069 (85.97% of the population over 6 years).

As of the 2001 India census, Dhanyakuria had a population of 4,168. Males constitute 51% of the population. Dhanyakuria has an average literacy rate of 75%, higher than the national average of 59.5%: male literacy is 81% and, female literacy is 68%. In Dhanyakuria, 10% of the population is under 6 years of age.

Education
Dhanyakuri Higher Secondary School is a co-educational school.

Healthcare
Dhanyakuria Rural Hospital at Dhanyakuria with 30 beds in the main medical facility in Basirhat II CD Block, there are primary health centres at Sikra Kulingram (with 6 beds) and Rajendrapur (with 10 beds).

North 24 Parganas district is one of the areas where groundwater is affected by arsenic contamination.

References

Cities and towns in North 24 Parganas district